, also known as Johnny Sokko and His Flying Robot in the United States, is a manga and tokusatsu series created by Mitsuteru Yokoyama. It is similar to Yokoyama's Tetsujin 28-go (known as Gigantor in the U.S.), but Giant Robo has more elements of fantasy. The original 26-episode tokusatsu TV series, produced by Toei Company, aired on NET (later renamed TV Asahi) from October 11, 1967 to April 1, 1968.

Plot
Earth is invaded by an interstellar terrorist group, Big Fire (the Gargoyle Gang in the American version), led by Emperor Guillotine. Guillotine spends most of his time in a multicolored space ship hidden at the bottom of Earth's ocean, from which he issues his orders.

The group has been capturing scientists to create an army of monsters to help them conquer Earth. A boy named Daisaku Kusama (Johnny Sokko in the American version) and a young Unicorn peacekeeping agent named Jūrō Minami (Jerry Mano in the American version) are shipwrecked on an island after their ship is attacked by the sea monster Dakolar and subsequently captured by Big Fire. They flee onto an elevator leading to a complex where a Pharaoh-like giant robot is being built by captive scientist Lucius Guardian, who gives Daisaku and Jūrō its control device. Guardian helps them escape before he is shot to death; before he dies, he triggers an atomic bomb which destroys the base. The radiation activates the robot, which now obeys only Daisaku. The boy is invited by Jūrō and his chief, Azuma, to join Unicorn and fight Big Fire with Giant Robo.

Cast
 Mitsunobu Kaneko as Daisaku Kusama/Johnny Sokko
 Toshiyuki Tsuchiyama as Giant Robo/Giant Robot
 Koichi Chiba as Narrator
 Akio Ito as Juro Minami/Jerry Mano
 Shozaburo Date as Chief Azuma 
 Tomomi Kuwabara as Mari Hanamura
 Hirohiko Sato as Emperor Guillotine
 Yumiko Katayama as Mitsuko Nishino

English voice actors
 Bobbie Byers
 Paul Brown
Mark Harris

Characters

The Gargoyle Gang
In the American version of the series, the Gargoyle Gang is an ambitious, but incompetent, terrorist group with a high mortality rate. They wear a combination of Soviet and Wehrmacht military uniforms, Central American guerrilla clothing and Italian designer sunglasses. The members of the gang all have explosive devices implanted in their bodies that are to be detonated instantly if they are captured.

Monsters
In each episode, the Gargoyle Gang sends a monster to attack its enemies (the Japanese version's names are listed first, followed by the American version's names):
Dakolar (Dracolon): Appears in Episodes 1 and 11; swims, has tentacle arms and spits sand.
Globar (Nucleon and the Radion Globe): Appears in Episodes 2 and 20; resembles a walking limpet mine.
The Satan Rose (The Gargoyle Vine): Appears in Episodes 3 and 17; powers include rapid growth, constricting tentacle-like vines, suction flowers and lava bombs.
Lygon (Ligon-Tyrox): Appears in Episodes 4 and 10; powers include a forehead horn drill, mouth flames, a wrecking ball and swimming.
Gangar (The Gigantic Claw): Appears in Episodes 5 and 18; powers include flight, missiles and a rope.
Dorogon (Dragon and Staaker): Appears in Episodes 6 and 21; powers include flight, swimming, missiles, invisibility and the abilities to both consume aircraft and ocean vessels and grow and shrink in size (the last with the aid of a special device).
Ikageras (Scalion): Appears in Episodes 7 and 26; powers include swimming, hurricane winds and acid spray.
Doublion (Double Head): Appears in Episode 8; powers include head rotation and both a sticky petroleum-based liquid and flames that are emitted from each of its two mouths.
Sparky (Tentaclon): Appears in Episodes 9 and 22; powers include levitation, electric tentacles and rays.
Unbalan (Amberon): Appears in Episode 12; powers include self-mummification, resistance to electricity and photosynthesis.
Gammons (Opticon in the American version, Opticorn in the American version's title): Appears in Episodes 13 and 26; powers include levitation, retractable legs, a vacuum, a searchlight and an energy ray.
Iron Power (Flying Jawbone): Appears in Episode 14; powers include flight, sharp pointed teeth and body separation.
Icelar (Igganog): Appears in Episodes 15, 24 and 26; powers include burrowing, freezing winds and low body temperature.
GR-2 (Torozon): Appears in Episodes 16 and 19; powers include an electric head boomerang, burrowing and eye lasers.
Calamity (Cleopat): Appears in Episode 22; made with armor that reacts to long-range attacks.
Hydrazona: Appears in Episode 24; an acidic virus with a blob-like form.
Drakulon: Appears in Episode 25; powers include vampirism, size-alteration, a shield and a rapier.

Emperor Guillotine
Guillotine is a blue-skinned alien who has tentacles extending from the bottom of his head. He wears a long robe, carries a staff with a white orb at one end and can grow to a great height, which he does only in the final episode of the series.

Guillotine leaves day-to-day matters in the hands of various commanders (again, the Japanese version's names are listed first, followed by the American version's names):
Spider, a human who is killed by a spray of acid from Ikageras' (Scalion's) mouth
Doctor Over (Doctor Botanus), a silver-skinned alien capable of teleportation
Red Cobra (Fangar, Dangor the Executioner), a bizarre mutant with protruding teeth, a peg leg and a gigantic forehead 
Black Dia (Harlequin), a human who is fascinated with playing-card suits
Millerman (The Space Mummy), an alien resembling a clothed Egyptian mummy
Mr. Gold (Goldenaut), a golden-armored robot knight
Doctor Germa (Doctor Eingali), an evil yokai responsible for the creation of a Daisaku Kusuma android that briefly controls Giant Robo before its destruction

Arsenal
Giant Robo has a number of weapons, including finger missiles, a back missile, a bazooka cannon, radion eye beams, a flying-V missile, a flamethrower and electric wires.

Alternate versions
The English-dubbed American version of the series directed by Reuben Guberman, was produced by American International Television. It was first broadcast in the United States in 1969 by AIP-TV and was in syndication through the early 1980s. It also aired during the early 1970s through the 1990's in Australia, the United Kingdom, Brazil, India, and various Southeast Asian and Latin American countries.

In 1970, stock footage from episodes 1, 2, 10, 17 and 26 were edited together and released by AIP-TV as a 100-minute made-for-TV film called Voyage Into Space.

Home media releases 
A hastily edited seven-minute highlight reel of Voyage Into Space was created for the Super 8 home movie market during the early 1970s by Ken Films.

Toei Video released 22 episodes of the series on Betamax and VHS for the Japanese market in 1981 and 1982 and later released the entire series on LaserDisc in Japan during the 1990s. It is also available on DVD in Japan. 

In 1996, the Johnny Sokko version of the series was re-released through distribution by Orion Home Video and Streamline Pictures containing eight episodes in production order on four volumes (two episodes on each videocassette). Plans for further volumes were cancelled due to the parent company Orion Pictures being purchased by Metro-Goldwyn-Mayer in 1997.

On March 26, 2013, Shout! Factory released the 26-episode, four-disc box set Johnny Sokko and His Flying Robot: The Complete Series on DVD in Region 1.

In February 2021, a remastered version of Voyage Into Space was released on Blu-ray by RoninFlix and Scorpion Releasing.

Violence concerns
Although the series was violent by 1960s American standards for children's programming, in Japan it was no more violent than other tokusatsu TV series airing at the time. Gunfights are a staple of each episode and the show's two child leads (Johnny Sokko and Mari Hanson) were frequently seen shooting with the other Unicorn agents. In one episode, Johnny and Mari are captured and tied to trees by Gargoyle and are within seconds of being executed by a firing squad when they are rescued by Unicorn agents. Nearly every Japanese anime exported to the United States during that period was edited for violence, but in Johnny Sokko and His Flying Robot, only a minimum of violence was removed. (At least one US TV station, WXON in Detroit, ran disclaimers before each show saying, "Remember, kids, Johnny Sokko is make-believe and the actors are just pretending.") In addition to dubbing American voice actors for the American version, many of the show's sound effects were remixed or re-recorded.

List of episodes
The following episode titles were transcribed from the on-screen title cards of the American version. They are in their original Japanese and American broadcast order, verified by previews for the next episode at the end of each one:

Related series
 is an animated TV series written by Chiaki Konaka (Serial Experiments Lain, The Big O) and directed by Masahiko Murata (Jinki:EXTEND, Mazinkaiser). At the dawn of the 21st century, Earth is overrun by giant robots. Daisaku Kusama encounters the titular Robo in a ruin in Okinawa. Beckoned by forces he cannot understand, Daisaku is made to bond, body and spirit, with the ancient weapon and defend his homeland from the incoming evil.

In popular culture
Frank H. Wu, a Johnny Sokko fan as a child, describes several episodes of the show in his book Yellow: Race in America Beyond Black and White.

Guitarist Buckethead named his early band and second studio album after the series, including several references to characters and events from the series in his music.

Punk band The Vandals recorded "Big Bro vs. Johnny Sako" on their 1984 album When in Rome Do as The Vandals.

The indie band Johnny Socko took their name from the TV show.

Giant Robo makes an unauthorized appearance in the 1987 Arcade Game Ginga Ninkyouden as a boss character named G Robo, who suffers from nosebleeding when he is defeated.

Giant Robo makes a background cameo in the South Park episode (S11 Ep.12) "Imaginationland Episode III" and in the 1991 OVA Otaku no Video.

The show's now-famous ending has been paid tribute to in several other mecha series, including Daitetsujin 17 and The Iron Giant.

References

External links
Johnnysokko.com
The Johnny Sokko Forum – Started on May 16, 2008
A Complete Guide to Toei's 1960s Sci/Fi Series by Keith Sewell

Episode synopses  at SciFi Japan TV
Yumiko Katayama blog 片山由美子の70's メモリー☆そして今♪

1960s Japanese television series
1967 Japanese television series debuts
1968 Japanese television series endings
Giant Robo
Japanese science fiction television series
Television series by MGM Television
Toei tokusatsu
Toei tokusatsu films
Tokusatsu television series
TV Asahi original programming